The Riley Trophy is an award given to the Atlantic Hockey tournament champion since 2018. The trophy is named after long-time Army head coach Jack Riley and was created a little over a year after the legendary coach's death.

History
The AHA Tournament began the year after the dissolution of the MAAC's ice hockey division with all 8 remaining programs founding Atlantic Hockey. As the MAAC had previously been awarded an automatic berth, Atlantic Hockey immediately qualified for the postseason entry. The winner of the Riley Trophy will receive Atlantic Hockey's automatic bid to that years NCAA Tournament.

Champions
The Riley Trophy has been awarded every year since 2018. Past tournament champions for both Atlantic Hockey and its predecessor, MAAC, have also been included.

MAAC Champions

Atlantic Hockey Champions

Riley Trophy

Championships

By school

By coach

References

External links
Atlantic Hockey Online

 
College ice hockey in the United States lists